Kriva Bara is a village in northwestern Bulgaria.  It is located in the Kozloduy Municipality of the Vratsa Province.

A village of the same name also exists in the Brusartsi municipality of the Montana Province in Bulgaria.

References

Villages in Vratsa Province